This article is about the 2007 season of the Wakefield Trinity Wildcats.

Transfers 
Transfer for 2007 (In)

Transfer for 2007 (Out)

Super League XII table

1Bradford deducted 2 points for breaching of salary cap rules.

2Wigan deducted 4 points for breaching salary cap rules.

2007 season players

2008 signings/transfers
Gains

Losses

Re-Signings

References

Wakefield Trinity seasons
Wakefield Trinity Wildcats season